The 1982 Kent State Golden Flashes football team was an American football team that represented Kent State University in the Mid-American Conference (MAC) during the 1982 NCAA Division I-A football season. In their second season under head coach Ed Chlebek, the Golden Flashes compiled a 0–11 record (0–9 against MAC opponents), finished in last place in the MAC, and were outscored by all opponents by a combined total of 270 to 114.

The team's statistical leaders included Dana Wright with 363 rushing yards, Walter Kroan with 1,304 passing yards, and Todd Feldman with 519 receiving yards.

Schedule

References

Kent State
Kent State Golden Flashes football seasons
College football winless seasons
Kent State Golden Flashes football